Hooper is a populated place situated in Yavapai County, Arizona, United States. It was begun as a mining camp, originally called Foresight, which was a misspelling of Foresythe, having been named after the Foresythe family, one of whom, John Foresythe, served as postmaster.

References

Populated places in Yavapai County, Arizona